Acrocephalomyia zumbadoi is a species of fly in the genus Acrocephalomyia of the family Ropalomeridae.

Range 
Acrocephalomyia zumbadoi has been found in Costa Rica throughout the provinces of Guanacaste and Heredia.

References 

Insects described in 2012
Sciomyzoidea